In New York City, a planned congestion pricing scheme will charge vehicles traveling into or within the central business district of Manhattan. First proposed in 2007, this disincentivizing fee to cut down on traffic congestion was approved and included in the 2019 New York State budget. 

Since the early 20th century, there have been several proposals for traffic congestion fees or limits for vehicles traveling into or within the Manhattan central business district. A recurring proposal was adding tolls to all crossings of the East River, which separates Manhattan from Long Island; four bridges across the East River have not charged tolls since the early 20th century. In the 1970s, after New York City was deemed to be in violation of the Clean Air Act, Mayor John Lindsay proposed limiting cars in Lower Manhattan and tolling all crossings of the East River, but ultimately withdrew the proposal. Lindsay's successor Abraham Beame subsequently opposed the tolling scheme. Beame's successor Ed Koch attempted to restore limits on vehicles entering Manhattan, but the federal government preempted his plan. New York City was judged to be compliant with the Clean Air Act in 1981, and through the 1980s and 1990s, other proposals to limit congestion in New York City stagnated.

A congestion pricing scheme was proposed in 2007 by Mayor Michael Bloomberg as a component of PlaNYC, his strategic plan for the city. However, the proposal stalled in the New York State Assembly. In response to the 2017 state of emergency of the Metropolitan Transportation Authority (MTA), Governor Andrew Cuomo proposed a scheme similar to Bloomberg's that would take advantage of open road tolling technology and provide a revenue stream for the MTA. In 2019, following another two years of negotiation, Cuomo and Mayor Bill de Blasio agreed to implement congestion pricing in order to stem the ongoing transit crisis. , due to various delays, the rollout had been postponed to 2023.

Early plans 

Plans for reducing vehicular traffic in New York City's central business districts, as well as adding tolls to crossings into Manhattan, date to the early 20th century. In particular, many proposals involved adding tolls to the Brooklyn, Manhattan, Williamsburg, and Queensboro Bridge across the East River, which separates Long Island from the island of Manhattan. These bridges originally had tolls, but these were removed before the Great Depression. In 1933, in the midst of the Depression, the New York City Comptroller proposed reinstating tolls on the bridges in order to raise money for the city. This received opposition from residents of Brooklyn and Queens, in western Long Island, because the four free bridges were the only means of traveling freely to and from Long Island. Civic groups also opposed the proposal. In June 1933, Mayor John P. O'Brien acquiesced to a plan to charge city residents annual fees for any vehicles they owned, and to add a surcharge to all taxi trips. Out-of-town residents would pay tolls to cross the East and Harlem Rivers on the east side of Manhattan; since motorists already paid tolls to cross the Hudson River on the west side of Manhattan, this plan would have effectively created a congestion charge to enter and exit Manhattan. Several groups came together to protest against O'Brien's proposal, and his successor Fiorello H. La Guardia canceled O'Brien's proposed traffic fees when he entered office the next year.

In 1952, city planner Goodhue Livingston suggested that tolls be added on the four free East River bridges in order to fund the New York City Subway. By 1966, New York City Mayor John Lindsay was considering implementing tolls on all East River crossings, as well as raising prices on existing tolled crossings. In 1968, an outgoing member of the then-new Metropolitan Transportation Authority, which controlled New York City's transit system as well as the city's tolled crossings, suggested adding tolls to the East River crossings in order to encourage mass transit use. The proposal was brought up again in 1971.

In the early 1970s, the office of Mayor Lindsay experimented with limiting and banning private cars in downtown Manhattan following federal pressure to improve city air quality. His original proposal, to ban noncommercial midday traffic in Manhattan's Financial District, was reduced to a parking ban at the request of business executives. The parking ban, announced in September 1970, affected a triangular 50-block area south of Fulton Street and upset truckers and merchants who worked in the area. A later transportation commissioner said that the plans were fashionable [but] unfeasible due to unexamined commerce relationships and lack of preemptive buy-in from merchants. Lindsay's future proposals were restricted in scale.

In 1970, the government enacted the Clean Air Act, a series of federal air pollution regulations. Since New York City was in violation of these new regulations, it was given until 1975 to be compliant; this was later pushed back to 1977 after the state was given a 2-year delay in implementing the standards. Mayor Lindsay and the federal Environmental Protection Agency developed a plan to collect tolls on twelve free bridges across the Harlem and East Rivers, banning midtown parking, and significantly reducing the number of parking spaces south of 59th Street. They also proposed to retrofit air filtering devices on cars entering New York City's main business districts. The successive mayor, Abraham Beame, refused to implement the plan, even after federal order in 1975, but environmentalists received a court order in 1976 to proceed with implementation. Congress forbade the bridge tolls and taxi restrictions went into effect; the parking ban was the most controversial and consequential aspect of the act, and its forced implementation was poorly executed. In April 1977, Beame's administration released a report that opposed the addition of tolls, a proposal that future Mayor Michael Bloomberg's congestion pricing plan would address thirty years later. The report supported a bill in the New York State Legislature that, if passed, would permanently ban tolls on the East River bridges. Although such a plan would generate revenue for the city, the administration concluded that tolling the free crossings would cause congestion and pollution without enticing drivers to use public transportation. The state departments of environment and transportation concurred with Beame's position, and in a May 1977 report, recommended that tolls not be enacted, despite the fact that the pollution standards had yet to be met.

Mayor Ed Koch too explored possibilities for a ban on private cars in 1979, only permitting mass transit, delivery, and emergency vehicles. In January of that year, the state unveiled another plan for reducing emissions in the New York City area, with the goal of being in compliance with the Clean Air Act by December 1982. As part of the state's plan, transit fares would be kept low, while passenger cars would undergo emissions tests every year. The same June, passenger vehicles were banned from traveling along 49th and 50th Streets in Midtown Manhattan during weekdays. According to the city's transportation commissioner, this had the intended effect of reducing traffic. The next year, Koch's office sought to ban single-occupancy cars from the East River bridges during weekday morning rush hour, but the State Supreme Court ruled that the city did not have that authority. Other actions, such as bicycle and bus lanes, a reduction in parking spaces, and automobile inspections, were left in place. In 1981, the national administration deemed New York City in compliance with the federal air pollution regulations after a decade of noncompliance. Carbon monoxide levels decreased over the decade with improvements in car emissions. The number of cars inbound to Manhattan continued to rise and vehicle exhaust remained the top source of pollution in New York City.

Bloomberg's 2008 proposal 
On December 12, 2006, Mayor Bloomberg announced his goals for long-term sustainability through the year 2030. On April 22, 2007 (Earth Day), PlaNYC 2030 was unveiled. Along with transportation initiatives, the plan outlined steps to clean up brownfields, create affordable housing, utilize open spaces, provide cleaner and more reliable and efficient energy sources, improve water quality and infrastructure, achieve cleaner air quality, and address climate change issues. The transportation initiatives support greater use of mass transit through various improvements and additions to transit infrastructure and services. In addition, the initiatives also include increased use of cycling, expanded ferry services, increased traffic violation enforcement, and installations of Muni Meters and an intelligent transportation system. Of the 16 proposed transportation initiatives in PlaNYC, the congestion pricing program is the only component that has to be approved by the New York State Legislature with financial support from the State; the remainder is within New York City's or its regional jurisdiction and is to be funded by a new Sustainable Mobility and Regional Transportation Financing Authority, which would also take in revenue from the congestion fees, estimated at $380 million.

New York City applied to be part of the United States Department of Transportation's Urban Partnership Program, which would allocate money to cities that were willing to fight urban traffic congestion through toll roads, express bus services or bus rapid transit, remote work, or technologies designed for the purpose. In June 2007, United States Secretary of Transportation Mary Peters said that out of the nine finalist cities applying for the program, New York City was the farthest along in its traffic reduction planning and the city was eligible for up to $500 million for funding the congestion pricing plan. Since the final funding decision would be announced in August, Peters wrote in a letter to Governor Eliot Spitzer that if state approval was not met by July 16, "it is unlikely that New York City would be selected." Although a commitment was not established by that date, on July 19, the State legislature approved the creation of a 17-member commission that would study different plans to reduce traffic in the city, including congestion pricing. Signed by Spitzer on July 27, the bill authorized New York to apply for at least $200 million in federal funds.

On August 14, 2007, the U.S. Department of Transportation awarded from the Urban Partnership program $354 million to New York City. It was the largest of the five grants awarded to cities, which included San Francisco, King County, Washington (Seattle), the Minneapolis area, and Miami. Only $10.4 million was allocated for launching the congestion pricing program and $2 million for research. The rest of the grant funded transportation infrastructure and services: $213.6 million to improve and build new bus depots, $112.7 million to develop bus rapid transit routes, and $15.8 million for expanded ferry services. The idea of congestion pricing was endorsed by Spitzer, Senate Majority Leader Joseph Bruno, and other New York City politicians, such as City Council Speaker Christine Quinn, Manhattan Borough President Scott Stringer, and Representative Joseph Crowley of Queens and the Bronx, as well as the U.S. Department of Transportation. Assembly Speaker Sheldon Silver and other politicians expressed skepticism about the plan, raising several questions about its viability, its environmental effects on neighborhoods bordering the congestion zone, the lack of state control in Bloomberg's proposal, and what they believed to be a regressive tax on some commuters.

Components
Bloomberg's proposal cited comparable congestion pricing in London, Singapore and Stockholm.  New York City's was to be a three-year pilot program, at the end of which the City and State would decide if the program should be made permanent.  Upon final legislative approval, the program could be put into effect within 18 months.

The proposed congestion pricing zone was defined as the island of Manhattan, bordered by the East and Hudson Rivers south of 60th Street. The northern border of the congestion zone was originally slated to be 86th Street, but this changed after the commission's recommendation released on January 10, 2008. Exempted roadways within the zone include the FDR Drive, New York Route 9A (West Side Highway and Henry Hudson Parkway included), the Battery Park Underpass, and the East River bridges (Queensboro Bridge, Williamsburg Bridge, Manhattan Bridge and Brooklyn Bridge) and their approaches. A free route from the East River bridges to the FDR Drive and from the Lincoln and Holland Tunnels to Route 9A would be designated. Drivers who use toll crossings to or from the zone (e.g. Brooklyn-Battery Tunnel and Queens-Midtown Tunnel) would be charged the difference between the toll and the congestion charge.

The charge would apply on weekdays from 6:00 a.m. to 6:00 p.m. Proposed fees would be $8 for cars and commercial vehicles and $21 for trucks entering from outside the zone. Transit buses, emergency vehicles, taxis and for-hire vehicles, and vehicles with disabled parking plates would not be charged the fee. Taxi and livery trips that begin, end or touch the zone would have a $1 surcharge. Vehicles would be charged only once per day.

Operations for monitoring vehicles within the congestion zone will be barrier-free and includes E-ZPass transponders and a license plate recognition system that involves cameras. The system for monitoring congestion pricing will be made separate from existing red-light camera systems. Drivers would be able to pay by a debit from their E-ZPass account or a debit from a pre-paid non-E-ZPass account linked to the vehicle's license plate number. For drivers without traffic payment accounts, they would have 48 hours to pay via phone, the Internet, text messaging, or cash transactions at participating retailers.

Reaction

The Campaign for New York's Future supported congestion pricing throughout the political discussion. They argued that the plan would reduce road congestion, shorten commutes, reduce air pollution, and raise funds for long-term mass transit upgrades. The Tri-State Transportation Campaign, a member of the Campaign for New York's Future, released an analysis of Census data showing that the vast majority (approximately 93–99%) of workers in the MTA service area, and in individual legislative districts, did not drive to work in Manhattan. TSTC stated that the data showed that congestion pricing was progressive policy.

Several other entities, including the Metropolitan Transportation Authority (MTA), the Partnership for New York City, and the New York League of Conservation Voters, supported the proposed congestion pricing.  The MTA, in particular, would have benefited from the proposal; its accelerated Capital Plan for 2008–2013 details transit investments that revenue from congestion pricing would have paid for. These include 44 subway station rehabilitations, increased bus service, new Select Bus Service bus rapid transit in all 5 boroughs, $40 million for suburban park and ride facilities, Metro-North and LIRR station rehabilitations, LIRR third track work, East Side Access, Second Avenue Subway, and Fulton Center.

An August 2007, Quinnipiac University poll found that New York City voters opposed the plan 57% to 36%. Most of the opposition came from the outer boroughs, which, with the exception of the Bronx, would lose their toll-free access under the plan. On the other hand, 58% of voters would support the plan if the funds were used toward improving mass transit. In a subsequent poll conducted in November 2007, the opposition rate had risen to 61%, while support had fallen to 33% A third poll taken in March 2008 found that New York City voters supported congestion pricing by a margin of 67 percent to 27 percent if the money were used for mass transit improvements, and statewide voters supported the plan 60% to 30%, although the majority of New Yorkers surveyed had been unaware that a $1 taxi surcharge was included in the plan. Then-presidential candidate Barack Obama, multiple city and state legislators, and community leaders openly expressed support for the plan.

New York State Assembly Speaker Sheldon Silver, who represented the Financial District of Manhattan, opposed the plan, citing several issues. Since motorists would want to avoid the congestion pricing zone, he claimed they would choose to park in neighborhoods just outside the pricing zone, in turn creating massive traffic jams and add more traffic and pollution to those neighborhoods. Silver also stated that because the plan would reduce traffic in Manhattan's central business district but not necessarily elsewhere, neighborhoods with high asthma rates such as Harlem, the South Bronx, and Bedford-Stuyvesant would not benefit. The installation of cameras for tracking purposes might have raised civil liberties concerns. However, Silver did not oppose the entire plan, and said he would continue to work toward an agreement. Other opponents argued that the pricing could become a tax on middle- and lower-class residents, since those citizens would be affected the most financially. At the same time, higher-income commuters would not be turned off by paying the charges; thus the fee would not do much to discourage traffic into the congestion area. The Queens Chamber of Commerce released a report that concluded that implementing congestion pricing would cause a net reduction in the number of people going into Manhattan's central business district each day. The report stated that the congestion pricing plan could cost the city $1.89 billion per year in economic losses.

In response to many of these issues, Bloomberg argued that a significant percentage of commuters would switch to public transportation, and most likely for all of their commute; thus cars would be taken off the road outside the Central Business District as well as within it. John Gallagher, a Bloomberg spokesman, also said that "toll shopping", a tendency for drivers to seek toll-free routes, will end as all commuters who go to the congestion zone will have to pay tolls.

On July 9, 2007, Assemblyman Richard Brodsky issued a report that called the proposal thoughtful and bold, but expressing skepticism on points including financial fairness and environmental impact. Brodsky called the proposal a "regressive tax" on the poor and middle class and harmful to citizens of New York City's outer boroughs. The report mentioned several insufficiently studied alternatives, though it did not recommend any of them. These alternatives included road space rationing; better traffic enforcement; time-of day pricing on mass transit; taxes on gasoline, payroll, commuting, or stock transfers; and fees on city parking permits

Keep NYC Congestion Tax Free, a coalition of about 80 civic, business and labor organizations and businesses throughout the New York metropolitan area, proposed alternative traffic mitigation measures that were cheaper and had less impact. The group stated that these measures would raise between $428 million and $545 million in annual incidental revenues, and that this revenue would also qualify for the federal grant. It also recommended revenue measures that would raise nearly $1.8 billion to mass transit projects to induce less driving through better transit service.

Vote on proposal
On January 31, 2008, the New York City Traffic Congestion Mitigation Commission approved a plan for congestion pricing, which was passed by a vote of 13 to 2. Some changes over Mayor Bloomberg's original proposal were introduced, such as reducing the congestion zone, no charges for vehicles which stay within the zone, and a discount for low-emission trucks. The commission estimated that revenues from the congestion charge would generate $491 million a year, which would be committed to improve and expand the region's mass transit. The proposal was approved by the New York City Council on March 31, 2008 by a vote of 30 to 20. The only "No" votes came from Brooklyn, Queens and Staten Island. Brooklyn and Queens strongly opposed the bill in the City Council, voting against it by a margin of nearly two to one; both boroughs, which are located on Long Island, become geographically isolated without access to free bridges as Manhattan and the Bronx block their access to the mainland.
 
Another alternative considered by the commission, and promoted by Assemblyman Richard Brodsky, was to restrict access into the congestion zone one day a week based on the last digits of the license plates. This sort of road space rationing system is currently practiced in two of the world's Top 10 megacities, São Paulo and Mexico City. Bloomberg's plan was endorsed by the then new Governor David Paterson, whose support was considered key to approving the bill in Albany.
 
The deadline to approve the plan by the State Assembly was April 7, 2008, for the city to be eligible to receive US$354 million in federal assistance for traffic congestion relief and mass transit improvements. On April 7, 2008, after a closed-door meeting, the Democratic Conference of the State Assembly decided not to vote on the proposal. "The opposition was so overwhelming,...that he would not hold an open vote of the full Assembly," said Sheldon Silver, the Assembly Speaker. Afterwards, the USDOT announced that they will seek to allocate those funds to relief traffic congestion in other cities. Shortly thereafter, most of the federal grant that was to have gone to New York City was instead awarded to Chicago for bus-only lanes and more buses, as well as to Los Angeles for high-occupancy toll lanes.
 
Coincidentally, by July 2008, gasoline prices of over $4.00 a gallon caused a 5 percent drop in vehicle trips into lower Manhattan. The decrease confirmed the plan's premise that higher driving costs would in fact reduce congestion. However, at the same time, the gas price increase temporarily rendered the congestion pricing plan unnecessary, at least while fuel prices stayed high.

2015 proposal 

Move NY, a 2015 proposal by former Traffic Commissioner Sam Schwartz, incorporates congestion pricing for central Manhattan. It creates incentives to travel around, rather than through, Manhattan. These incentives included the creation of a congestion-priced central business district below 60th Street, where drivers had to pay an $8 cash toll or a $5.54 E-ZPass toll to enter the area. The four free East River bridges, all located below 60th Street, would charge tolls, while outer-borough crossings such as the Throgs Neck Bridge would see reduced tolls. Tolls would also be charged within Manhattan for all drivers traveling below 60th Street. The proposal would raise an estimated $1.5 billion annually, of which 75% would go to the MTA and 25% to the New York City Department of Transportation. The borough president of Queens, Melinda Katz, opposed the proposal. Bills to implement Move NY were introduced at the state level in 2016, but the legislation never passed.

2017 proposal 

As complaints about the city subway's delays and disrepair reached a fever pitch in summer 2017, Governor Andrew Cuomo drafted a congestion pricing proposal with lessons from Bloomberg's handling of the State Legislature. Despite having earlier doubted such a plan's viability, Cuomo described congestion pricing as "an idea whose time has come". London and Stockholm had implemented the concept successfully. Cuomo's plan is expected to differ significantly from Bloomberg's proposal. Its primary intent is to raise funds for city transit and reduce street gridlock, while balancing suburban commuter considerations. The New York Times reflected that Bloomberg's 2008 proposal, which would have raised  annually, could have rectified infrastructure issues and emergency repair schedule affecting the subway in 2017. The plan could be implemented through open road tolling, which records E-ZPass transponders and license plates without forcing the vehicles to slow down significantly, thus increasing vehicle throughput. This would coincide with MTA Bridges and Tunnels' ongoing project to convert all of its crossings from a tollbooth-based system to an open road tolling system. This was in contrast to the circumstances during Bloomberg's tenure, when open road tolling was not widely used yet. At the time, New York City had the third worst traffic congestion of any city worldwide, behind Moscow and Los Angeles.

In October 2017, the New York State Government created a task force, Fix NYC, to find solutions for fixing mass transit and lowering congestion. The task force was assigned to study traffic on New York City's roadways and report its findings to Cuomo by December. Fix NYC included congestion pricing advocates such as Sam Schwartz, Charles Komanoff, and Alex Matthiessen, who had supported the congestion-pricing proposal even after Bloomberg's plan had been defeated.

Initial recommendations

In December 2017, as part of its report, Fix NYC recommended implementing tolls based on time of day and geographical zone. Under the task force's plan, the only drivers who would be able to avoid a toll would be those who cross the Brooklyn Bridge or Queensboro Bridge and then immediately exit onto the FDR Drive once they reach Manhattan.

Final components
A congestion pricing proposal in March 2019 was ultimately passed on April 1 as part of the New York State Budget. While there were few details about the proposal, it would include the entire island of Manhattan south of 60th Street, except for the FDR Drive and West Side Highway, as well as the Battery Park Underpass connecting the two highways. Vehicles would be tolled only once per day.

As part of the law, the Central Business District Tolling Program would be planned by, implemented by and operated by the Triborough Bridge and Tunnel Authority. The TBTA board will institute a "traffic mobility review" board, which will consist of a chair and five members, who will be appointed by the TBTA board. One of the members will be recommended by the New York City Mayor, one will live in the Metro-North region, and one will live in the Long Island Rail Road region. This board will recommend the toll amounts between November 15, 2020 and December 31, 2020, or no later than 30 days before the implementation of the tolling program. A public hearing will be held before the board's vote. In the event of a tie, the chair will be given an additional vote.

The board will recommend an amount that provides a minimum of $15 billion in funding for the MTA's 2020-2024 Capital Program, not including the costs of the tolling program. This funding will be put into the central business district tolling capital lockbox fund. The majority of the funds, 80%, would be used for the Staten Island Railway, New York City Subway, and MTA Regional Bus Operations, while 10% each would be given to the Long Island Rail Road and Metro-North Railroad. The traffic mobility review board will also be granted the power to review the MTA's Capital Program. The board will also recommend tolling exemptions, which will be determined by a traffic study of their impact. Authorized emergency vehicles and qualifying vehicles transporting people with disabilities will not be charged the toll. A plan to address charges on for-hire vehicles will be implemented by the TBTA.

The TBTA, in conjunction with the NYCDOT, will report on the effects of the tolling program, such as traffic congestion, air quality and emissions, mass transit ridership, and expenditures a year after the implementation of the plan, and every two years afterwards.

The exemption of the West Side Highway and the credit given to drivers using the Henry Hudson Bridge and heading into the congestion zone were added to the plan on March 31, 2019. Electrical toll-taking equipment will have to be installed at the more than 30 exits into the cordon from the West Side Highway, at the 11 exits from the FDR Drive, and at the eight avenues that delineate the northern boundary of the congestion zone at 59th Street/Central Park South.  Sam Schwartz suggested enforcing the West Side Highway exemption by process of elimination to reduce the cost of the toll readers. The law also exempted people living in the congestion zone who make less than $60,000 a year by deducting the cost of the tolls from their tax bills.

On March 28, 2019, the TBTA issued a request for technology (RFT) for alternate ways to implement the congestion pricing tolling. Options the TBTA included in the RFT are roadside bluetooth readers, connected vehicle technology, smartphone applications, and Global Navigation Satellite System based tolling.

Reaction

As with the Bloomberg proposal, Queens politicians still opposed Cuomo's proposal because it would potentially add tolls to the remaining free crossings over the East River. David Weprin, a New York State Assemblyman representing parts of Queens, called it "an additional tax on people who drive into Manhattan, often not wealthy people, but middle-class people". He said that much of Queens and many parts of Brooklyn had little access to mass transit, and that disabled residents from all boroughs would also be negatively affected because the subway was generally not accessible to people with disabilities. Bloomberg's successor, Bill de Blasio, also initially opposed congestion pricing. Instead, de Blasio proposed a tax on wealthy residents to fund the subway, even though a similar tax for universal prekindergarten had previously failed in the state legislature. He also clarified that he opposed Cuomo's plan because his tax on millionaires would be more effective in raising money. De Blasio's opposition came as some of his supporters in the 2017 mayoral election announced support for the plan, including the Working Families Party and Union Local 32BJ. Later in August 2017, it was clarified that de Blasio did not oppose congestion pricing specifically, and that his office was to look at any congestion pricing proposal by Cuomo's administration.

In May 2018, New York gubernatorial election candidate Cynthia Nixon proposed implementing both Cuomo's congestion pricing proposal and de Blasio's "millionaire tax", as well as a third proposal to levy fines on companies that pollute in the state. Nixon, a Democratic primary challenger to Cuomo, stated that all three proposals could be used to raise money for maintaining the city's subway system.

Many residents of Brooklyn and Queens opposed Cuomo's congestion pricing proposal because they would be forced to pay a toll to drive to Manhattan. These residents, in turn, had to drive because they lived too far from subway stations. Supporters included Uber, which was planning to begin a "six-figure" advertising campaign in support of congestion pricing in January 2018. The same month, the Tri-State Transportation Campaign released a report in support of congestion pricing. It found that in most New York State Assembly districts within the city, drivers tended to have higher incomes than mass-transit commuters, and that less than 10% of drivers from every district drove into the proposed congestion pricing area. However, Assemblyman Weprin said that this data was misleading since it did not take into account irregularly scheduled trips to Manhattan, such as for doctor's visits. New Jersey residents also criticized the plan, since there was a possibility that they could be charged twice. This was in response to speculation that the Holland Tunnel and Lincoln Tunnel tolls may be incorporated into the congestion pricing fee, because they entered Manhattan within the congestion pricing zone, while the toll of the George Washington Bridge may likely not be included since it was outside of the zone.

Cuomo's plan has faced mixed reviews from the media. A writer for Slate Magazine lauded the proposed charge, saying that it was "miraculously and inexplicably free" to drive a private car around Manhattan, and comparing it to the several-thousand-dollar average monthly rents for real estate in the borough. The New York Post said that the plan had two large flaws. First, none of the East River crossings would receive any congestion pricing revenue for maintenance. Second, the city would not receive revenue, either, even though it was in charge of maintaining the streets.

The public overall has generally supported Cuomo's plan. Two Pew Research studies conducted in 2018 and 2019 showed that a majority of many demographic groups, in all geographic areas, endorsed congestion pricing. Additionally, in January 2019, a study by Siena College Research Institute found that up to 52% of New York state registered voters supported congestion pricing. Meanwhile, opposition to congestion pricing declined from 44% in January 2018 to 39% in January 2019.

2019 approval

Initial plans and delays
The congestion toll was not included in the state budget that was passed in March 2018. However, a surcharge was levied on taxi, for-hire, and ride-share trips in Manhattan below 96th Street. This consisted of a $2.50 fee for each taxi trip in that area, a $2.75 fee for each privately operated for-hire trip in that area, and a $0.75 fee per rider for each ride-share trip in that area.

In a State of the State Address in January 2019, Cuomo announced another state budget, which would provisionally include congestion pricing. The following month, Cuomo and de Blasio jointly announced a plan that outlined ten steps to fix MTA operations. One of these steps called for enacting a form of congestion pricing by December 2020, a plan that both men agreed on for the first time. The revenue would go into a so-called lock box that could only be used by the MTA. In March 2019, Cuomo's congestion pricing plan was again included in the 2019 New York state budget, though specific details still had to be outlined. The plan was approved at the end of the month, though such a fee would not go into effect until 2021 at the earliest. This made New York City the first city in the United States to enact congestion pricing. A "Streets Master Plan", announced in October 2019, would impose a congestion fee at the end of 2020 and speed installation of bus and bicycle lanes. The congestion fee had to be approved by the Federal Highway Administration (FHWA) because some federal roads would be covered by the charge. News outlets reported in February 2020 that the congestion fee could potentially be blocked by the federal government of the United States, due to disagreements between Cuomo and U.S. president Donald Trump.

The COVID-19 pandemic in New York City resulted in a decline in use of the New York City Subway between March and June 2020.  Following the city's partial reopening in June, a mayoral panel projected that many people would choose to drive, for fear that taking mass transit would expose them to COVID-19, and studied congestion pricing as a solution to lessen road traffic.  However, the federal government had still not acted.  Janno Lieber, then the MTA's Chief Development Officer, said in July 2020 that congestion pricing could be delayed until 2022 because it would take one year to install the required infrastructure even after federal approval.  By November 2020, the MTA reported that the continued delays could postpone the start of congestion pricing to 2023.  Upon implementation, the revenue could be used to pay off pandemic-related deficits in the MTA's budget.

Federal approval and preparations
With the inauguration of Joe Biden as U.S. president in 2021, transit officials expressed optimism that the Biden administration would allocate funding to congestion pricing. Pete Buttigieg, the U.S. secretary of transportation, prioritized the congestion pricing plan that February. In March 2021, the federal government gave the MTA permission to conduct an environmental assessment. Eric Adams, who won the June 2021 New York City Democratic mayoral primary, also expressed his support for congestion pricing. As part of the federal government's approval of an environmental assessment, the MTA was obligated to discuss the plans with officials from Connecticut and New Jersey, as residents of these states would be affected by the plans. By mid-July, the MTA had only conducted one meeting with Connecticut officials and none with New Jersey officials. 

MTA officials had publicly stated in mid-2021 that the agency was earning enough from state taxes to pay for its capital upgrades and that it did not need congestion pricing funds for its 2020–2024 Capital Program. In response, de Blasio pressured the MTA to speed the implementation of congestion pricing, expressing his intention to have the surcharge in place by July 2022. In August 2021, New Jersey congressmen Josh Gottheimer and Jeff Van Drew proposed legislation in the U.S. House of Representatives, which would prohibit the MTA from obtaining some federal grants unless an exemption to the congestion-pricing plan was given to New Jersey drivers. The same month, the FHWA approved environmental assessment and public outreach for the congestion pricing plan, which was expected to take 16 months. Cuomo's resignation as governor that month also raised some uncertainty about the future of the congestion-pricing plan, as his successor Kathy Hochul had not committed to upholding congestion pricing. However, if the plan does receive federal approval, contractor TransCore must install toll equipment within 310 days.

The MTA held its first hearings on the congestion pricing plan on September 23, 2021. While prices had not yet been determined, the MTA's deputy chief operating officer said that drivers of passenger vehicles with E-ZPass would likely pay between $9 and $23 during peak hours, while toll-by-mail drivers would likely pay between $14 and $35. Drivers of trucks and other vehicle classes would pay a different fee. Vehicles would be charged once per day, and tolls during off-peak or overnight hours would likely be less, though the exact toll prices would depend on how many exemptions would be distributed. The MTA proposed that, for drivers with E-ZPass, off-peak tolls would range from $7 to $17, while overnight tolls would range from $5 to $12. The MTA had promised exemptions to emergency vehicles and disabled-rider transport, and it was also proposing a tax credit for low-income residents in the congestion pricing zone. In March 2022, the federal government requested that the MTA answer 430 questions about the technical aspects of the congestion charge before the MTA submitted the plan for a final public review. Hochul said in June 2022 that the congestion pricing plan would not be implemented for at least another year. The delay in the implementation of congestion pricing also posed issues for other projects, including the second phase of the Second Avenue Subway, which would be partially funded by income from the congestion charge. Neither the MTA nor the federal government were willing to publicly disclose many aspects of the review process.

Lee Zeldin, who at the time was the Republican nominee in the 2022 New York gubernatorial election, expressed his opposition to the proposal. Public hearings on the proposal were held during the final week of August 2022. According to an analysis by U.S. representative Josh Gottheimer of New Jersey, three-fourths of commenters were opposed to the plan. New Jersey governor Phil Murphy requested that the federal government complete a full environmental impact study of the plan, and several New York City politicians petitioned Hochul to hold a statewide referendum on the congestion-pricing plan. U.S. representatives Josh Gottheimer and Mike Lawler introduced legislation in early 2023, which would ban the MTA from using federal funding for its capital projects unless drivers were exempted from all taxes related to the congestion charge. The MTA indicated in February 2023 that it had further postponed the implementation of congestion pricing to late 2024.

See also
 London congestion charge
 Greater Manchester congestion charge
 Milan Area C
 Road pricing
 Road space rationing
 San Francisco congestion pricing
 Singapore Area Licensing Scheme
 Electronic Road Pricing (Singapore)
 Stockholm congestion tax

References

Further reading

External links
  

Road congestion charge schemes
Transportation in New York City
Transportation planning
Urban planning in New York City